Andrea Chianucci (Arezzo, 3 May 1999) is an Italian rugby union player, currently playing for Top12 side Fiamme Oro. He is also an additional player for the Pro14 side Zebre. His preferred position is flanker.

In 2019 Chianucci was named in the Italy Under 20 squad.

Zebre
Chianucci was named as an additional player in November 2020 for 2020–21 Pro14 season. He made his Zebre debut in Round 6 of the 2020–21 Pro14 against Munster.

References

External links
itsrugby.co.uk Profile

1999 births
Living people
Italian rugby union players
Zebre Parma players
Rugby union flankers